Thiès Sud is an arrondissement of Thiès in Thiès Region in Senegal.

References 

Arrondissements of Senegal